Iran's counties (shahrestan, also romanized as šahrestân) are administrative divisions of larger provinces (ostan). "County," therefore, is a near equivalent to shahrestan.

Counties are divided into one or more  districts. A typical district includes both cities and rural districts, which are groupings of adjacent villages. One city within the county serves as the capital of that county, generally in its Central District. 
 
Each county is governed by an office known as farmândâri, which coordinates different public events and agencies and is headed by a farmândâr, the governor of the county and the highest-ranking official in the division.

Among the provinces of Iran, Fars has the highest number of shahrestans (37), while Qom has the fewest (3). In 2005 Iran had 324 shahrestans, while in 2021 there were 471.

Guide
The total population of a province is the total of its counties.

The total population of a county is the total of its districts.

The total population of a district is the total of its cities and rural districts.

To better understand these subdivisions, the following table for Piranshahr County in West Azerbaijan province (as it existed in 2006, 2011 and 2016) is an example showing the hierarchy of a county's divisions:

List
The counties are listed below, by province, with the capital and the county containing the capital of the provinces in bold:

See also

Ostan
Bakhsh
Provinces of Iran

References

  [] (Gitashenasi Province Atlas of Iran)

 
Iran, Counties
Iran geography-related lists